Kimberly Benson (born 6 May 1991) is a Scottish professional wrestler. She is signed to WWE, where she performs on the Raw brand under the ring name Piper Niven (formerly Doudrop). Benson began her career on the UK independent circuit under the ring name Viper, also performing in Japan for World Wonder Ring Stardom. After participating in the 2017 Mae Young Classic, she was signed to a contract by WWE in 2019. She is a former one-time Artist of Stardom Champion, two-time ICW Women's Champion, one-time SWA World Champion, and two-time WWE 24/7 Champion.

Early life 
Kimberly Benson was born on 6 May 1991, in Kilbirnie, Scotland.

Professional wrestling career

Independent circuit (2007–2019) 
Before turning into a wrestler, she kept her love for professional wrestling as a secret due to being worried that her female friends thought she was "weird" as they believed that was only a sport for men. It wasn't until she was 15, and when her oldest nephew began to watch wrestling, that Benson's passion was rekindled and she was open about enjoying wrestling. She was introduced to this sport at a training school near her Ayrshire home and, according to her, she debuted at age 16 one year after beginning her training; making accounts with her age, this was in 2007. About her training, she said: "I got beat up, totally beat up. I remember lying in bed the next day, being so sore and in absolute agony, but I just loved it, I had to go back."

She was part of the special program of ITV World of Sport Wrestling celebrated on New Year's Eve 2016, and until April of that year, she was programmed to appear on a revival of the series. However, a month later before filming was set to begin, the project was postponed indefinitely. Although not long after, she received a phone call from WWE, one of the largest wrestling companies in the world, asking her to be part of the women's tournament, Mae Young Classic 2017. The event took place in 2017 and was an all-women tournament. Benson asked World of Sport Wrestling to release her from her contract to participate in the competition. She competed as Piper Niven since the name she was using was Viper and that was already the name of a WWE star inside the company, deciding to choose that name because she played bagpipes as a child, and Niven is her dad's first name. She defeated Santana Garrett in the first round and Serena Deeb in the round two, before being defeated by Toni Storm in the quarterfinals.

World Wonder Ring Stardom (2016–2019) 
In 2017, Benson worked in Japan as Viper for the company World Wonder Ring Stardom. On 7 January of that year, at the event Stardom New Years Stars 2017 – Tag 2, she was part of the team "Oedo Tai" with Kagetsu and Kyoko Kimura as a replacement for Hana Kimura who was injured, where she tried to help the team to retain the Artist of Stardom Championship against "Queen's Quest" a team integrated by HZK, Io Shirai and Momo Watanabe, in which they were defeated and they lost the title. On 13 August, she joined Queen's Quest along with Shirai and HZK to face the team "Team Jungle" integrated by Hiroyo Matsumoto, Jungle Kyona and Kaori Yoneyama in a match for the Artist of Stardom Championship at the event Midsummer Champions 2017, in which they achieved to win the title and Viper crown herself champion. On 16 September, Viper participated at the event 5★Star Grand Prix 2017 of Stardom, where she draw with Mayu Iwatani both with 10 points. Along with Queen's Quest, managed to defend and retain the Artistic Championship three times before they left it vacant on 15 April 2018 after a draft executed by Stardom, ending their reign with 245. One month before that same year, on 28 March, she faced Toni Storm at the Stardom Dream Slam in Tokyo event in a match for her SWA World Championship, in which the ICW Women's Championship of Viper was also in the line, where she defeated Storm to capture the title, emerging victorious with both championships. Defended and retained the championship twice before losing it in a match against Utami Hayashishita at the Stardom 8th Anniversary event held on 14 January 2019, in which she also put her EVE International Championship at stake, where she was defeated and lost both titles, ending her reign with the SWA Championship in 292 days and with the EVE Championship in 92 days.

WWE

NXT UK (2019–2021) 
In early 2019, a rumour started spreading in which it was said and expected that Viper signed with WWE, which came out to be true when she appeared and debuted on 27 March episode of NXT UK that year, where, under the ring name Piper Niven, she confronted Rhea Ripley. Niven had her first televised match with WWE after being signed on a special program entitled WWE Worlds Collide on 24 April, which consisted on various matches that involved wrestlers from all the brands; Raw, SmackDown, NXT, 205 Live and NXT UK, this last one was the brand that she belonged to and represented, defeating Zelina Vega of SmackDown. On 19 June episode of NXT UK, Niven competed in a battle royal to determine who would have a future opportunity to face the NXT UK Women's Champion Toni Storm. In the match, Niven was eliminated by Xia Brookside.

On 12 January 2020 at the NXT UK TakeOver: Blackpool II event, Niven competed in a triple threat match against Storm and Kay Lee Ray for the NXT UK Women's Championship, where Niven was defeated and pinned by Kay Lee. Niven returned to NXT UK television on 24 September of that year, where she challenged Kay Lee Ray in a match for the NXT UK Women's Championship, where she was defeated. On 19 November, Niven challenged Ray in a Falls Count Anywhere match for the NXT UK Women's Championship. Niven was again defeated by Kay Lee due to an interference made by Jinny.

Niven lost to Jinny in a No. 1 contenders match for the NXT UK Women's Championship on episode 7 January 2021 of NXT UK. On 11 March, Niven and Jack Starz defeated Jinny and Joseph Conners in the NXT UK's first-ever mixed tag team match.

Doudrop (2021–2022) 
On 14 June 2021 episode of Raw, Niven was traded to the brand as Eva Marie's unnamed protégé, defeating Naomi in her debut match. The following week on Raw, Marie introduced her as "Doudrop". Later that night, she and Marie were defeated in a tag team match by Asuka and Naomi. At SummerSlam, Doudrop turned against Marie, and on the following episode of Raw, Marie attacked Doudrop during an interview; starting a feud between them. After defeating Marie twice on 13 and 20 September episodes of Raw, on the next episode, Doudrop challenged Charlotte Flair for the Raw Women's Championship in a losing effort due to a distraction by Marie. In October, Doudrop entered the Queen's Crown tournament, where she defeated Natalya in the first round and Shayna Baszler in the semi-finals, but lost to Zelina Vega in the finals at Crown Jewel.

In 2022, after winning a triple threat No. 1 contendership match against Bianca Belair and Liv Morgan on an episode of Raw, Doudrop challenged Raw Women's Champion Becky Lynch for the title at Royal Rumble in a losing effort. At Elimination Chamber, she entered the Elimination Chamber match for a Raw Women's Championship match at WrestleMania 38, but was eliminated by Liv Morgan. Since June, she would chase the WWE 24/7 Championship, winning the title twice.

On 2 May episode of Raw, Doudrop approached Nikki A.S.H. backstage, suggesting to align together, which A.S.H. accepted. The following week on Raw, Doudrop alongside A. S. H. challenged the WWE Women's Tag Team Champions Naomi and Sasha Banks in a non-title match, but they were unsuccessful. After the Women's Tag Team Championship was vacated on May, A.S.H. and Doudrop entered a tournament to crown a new champions which began in August. They lost in the first round to Alexa Bliss and Asuka. On 26 August episode of SmackDown, A. S. H. and Doudrop entered a second chance four-way match to return to the tournament among other three teams, which was won by Natalya and Sonya Deville. On 30 August episode of NXT 2.0, A. S. H. and Doudrop made a surprise appearance as they challenged the NXT Women's Tag Team Champions Katana Chance and Kayden Carter for their titles at Worlds Collide. At the event, they failed to win the titles due to interference from Toxic Attraction (Gigi Dolin and Jacy Jayne). After a tag team match against Toxic Attraction on 6 September episode of NXT, Doudrop went on a hiatus due to illness.

Return as Piper Niven (2023–present) 
On 28 January 2023, Doudrop, under her former ring name "Piper Niven", participated at the Royal Rumble event in the namesake match as the 18th entrant. She lasted over 28 minutes and eliminated two wrestlers before being eliminated by Raquel Rodriguez.

Professional wrestling style and persona 
As "Piper Niven", Benson's finishing move is the Loch Ness Slam, a spinning side slam.

Other media 
Benson is the subject of the episode Fight Like a Girl of the documentary series Our Lives by BBC. The episode is about her life as a professional wrestler.

Benson made her video game debut in the Clowning Around Pack DLC for WWE 2K22 and as a regular playable character in WWE 2K23.

Personal life 
On Celebrate Bisexuality Day 2019, Benson came out as bisexual. Benson shared that she has Bell's palsy. Benson got married in September 2021.

Championships and accomplishments 
 Alpha Omega Wrestling
 AOW Women's Championship (1 time)
 Association Biterroise de Catch 
 ABC Women's Championship (1 time)
 Fierce Females
 Fierce Females Championship (1 time)
 Insane Championship Wrestling
 ICW Women's Championship (2 times)
 ICW Women's Championship Tournament (2015)
 Preston City Wrestling
 PCW Women's Championship (1 time)
 Pro-Wrestling: EVE
 Pro-Wrestling: EVE Championship (1 time)
 Pro-Wrestling: EVE International Championship (1 time)
 Pro Wrestling: EVE International Championship Tournament (2018)
 Pro Wrestling Illustrated
 Ranked No. 37 of the top 50 female wrestlers in the PWI Female 50 in 2017
 Scottish Wrestling Entertainment
 SWE Future Division Championship (1 time)
 Showcase Pro Wrestling
 Caledonian Cup (2014)
 World of Sport Wrestling
 WOS Women's Championship (2 times)
 World Wide Wrestling League
 W3L Women's Championship (1 time)
 World Wonder Ring Stardom
 Artist of Stardom Championship (1 time) – with HZK and Io Shirai
 SWA World Championship (1 time)
 Trios Tag Team Tournament (2019) – with Utami Hayashishita and Bea Priestley
 Wrestlers Reunion Scotland
 The George Kidd Scottish Wrestling Hall of Fame (2018)
 WWE
 WWE 24/7 Championship (2 times)

References

External links 

 
 
 

1991 births
21st-century LGBT people
21st-century professional wrestlers
Bisexual sportspeople
Bisexual women
Expatriate professional wrestlers in Japan
LGBT professional wrestlers
Living people
People from Ayrshire
Scottish expatriates in Japan
Scottish female professional wrestlers
Scottish LGBT sportspeople
SWA World Champions
WWE 24/7 Champions